In mathematics, specifically in order theory and functional analysis, the order dual of an ordered vector space  is the set  where  denotes the set of all positive linear functionals on , where a linear function  on  is called positive if for all   implies 
Along with the related concept of the order bound dual, this space plays an important role in the theory of ordered topological vector spaces.

Canonical ordering 

The positive elements of the order dual form a cone that induces an ordering on  called the canonical ordering.
If  is an ordered vector space whose positive cone  is generating (that is) then the order dual with the canonical ordering is an ordered vector space.

Properties 

The order dual is contained in the order bound dual. 

The order dual of a vector lattice is an order complete vector lattice. 
The order dual of a vector lattice  can be finite dimension (possibly even ) even if  is infinite-dimensional.

Order bidual 

Suppose that  is an ordered vector space such that the canonical order on  makes  into an ordered vector space. 
In particular, if  is a vector lattice then  is an order complete vector lattice.

Minimal vector lattice 

However, the image of this map is in general not order complete even if  is order complete. 
Indeed, a regularly ordered, order complete vector lattice need not be mapped by the evaluation map onto a band in the order bidual. 
An order complete, regularly ordered vector lattice whose canonical image in its order bidual is order complete is called minimal and is said to be of minimal type.

Examples 

For any , the Banach lattice  is order complete and of minimal type; 
in particular, the norm topology on this space is the finest locally convex topology for which every order convergent filter converges.

Properties 

Let  be an order complete vector lattice of minimal type. 
For any  such that  the following are equivalent: 
  is a weak order unit.
 For each topology  on  such that  is a locally convex vector lattice,  is a quasi-interior point of its positive cone.

Related concepts 

See also

References

Bibliography

  
  

Functional analysis